The Playlist is a British children's entertainment and music series presented by guest presenters, produced by Strawberry Blond TV for CBBC and first aired on 22 April 2017 and ended on 12 March 2022. The first series was narrated by Scott Mills. Each week the show has a different presenter with Greg James, Dev Griffin, MistaJam or Jordan North presenting the UK Singles Chart Top 10 segment and features various co-presenters since its 16th episode. The first presenters were Pixie Lott and Anton Powers. It is a replacement for the CBBC Official Chart Show, which ended in February 2017.

Format
Each week, on the CBBC website, there are ten different songs, and the user has three votes. They can be used all on one song, or they can vote for two or three songs. In the weeks leading up to more recent episodes, users only have one vote, therefore making it harder to choose. The three songs with the most votes are played on The Playlist. The user can also comment on songs and why they voted for them, either by uploading a short video, uploading a selfie or by leaving a comment on the CBBC website. The comments, as well as facts about the artist/artists, are displayed whilst a song is being played. Each week, BBC Radio 1 DJ Greg James, Dev Griffin or Jordan North also presents the UK Singles Chart Top 10, whilst playing short extracts from each song. In between these main segments, there are also games, and chats with the hosts.

Since series 2, the celebrity host chooses their three tracks.

Production
After the CBBC Official Chart Show ended in February 2017 after almost two years and 69 episodes, it was announced that the executive producer of the CBBC Official Chart Show was setting up his own independent production company, Strawberry Blond TV and CBBC was expected to return to the live music genre.

According to Broadcast magazine, The Playlist was to be incorporated into CBBC's new live Saturday morning TV series Saturday Mash-Up!, which was to begin in September 2017.

Presenters

Series 1 (April 2017–March 2018)

Series 2 (May 2018–March 2019)

Series 3 (April 2019–March 2020)

Series 4 (April 2020–March 2021)

Series 5 (April 2021-March 2022)

Notes

  5 After Midnight member Kieran Alleyne was unable to present this episode, due to tonsillitis.
  These episodes were co-presented by Yasser Ranjah.
  These episodes were co-presented by Jack Maynard.
  These episodes were co-presented by Lauren Layfield.
  These episodes were co-presented by Lewys Ball.
  These episodes were co-presented by Rio Fredrika.
  These episodes were co-presented by all presenters.
  These episodes were co-presented by Donel Mangena.

Playlist choices

Series 1

Official Singles Chart No. 1s

Series 1

Series 2

Series 3

Series 4

Notes

  The artists that took part were (in alphabetical order):
5 Seconds of Summer,
Anne-Marie,
AJ Tracey,
Biffy Clyro,
Bastille,
Celeste,
Chris Martin,
Dave Grohl,
Dermot Kennedy,
Dua Lipa,
Ellie Goulding,
Grace Carter,
Hailee Steinfeld,
Jess Glynne,
Mabel,
Paloma Faith,
Rag'n'Bone Man,
Rita Ora,
Royal Blood,
Sam Fender,
Sean Paul,
Sigrid,
Yungblud and
Zara Larsson.

Series 5

Transmissions

References

External links

BBC children's television shows
2017 British television series debuts
2022 British television series endings
2010s British children's television series
2010s British music television series
2020s British children's television series
2020s British music television series
BBC high definition shows
English-language television shows